Felecia Rotellini is an American attorney and politician who served as chair of the Arizona Democratic Party from 2018 to 2021. Rotellini spent 13 years as an assistant state attorney general before serving as the superintendent of the Arizona State Banking Department under Governor Janet Napolitano.  She twice ran for attorney general in 2010 and 2014.

Early life and education

Felecia Rotellini was born and raised in Sheridan, Wyoming to Clarice (née Koebbe) and Anselmo "Sam" Rotellini.

Rotellini developed an interest in politics due, in part, to her paternal grandfather who was a coal mining union organizer in the now defunct-town of Cambria, Wyoming.  While attending Rocky Mountain College, Rotellini participated in a Girls Staters event where Senator Gale W. McGee urged the crowd to "each make a political commitment."  As part of the activities of the event, Rotellini was elected as one of the "councilmen" for the mythical town of Cottonwood City.

Rotellini received her bachelor's degrees in history and political science (magna cum laude) from Rocky Mountain College in 1981, and a Juris Doctor from Notre Dame Law School in 1986.

Career 
She passed the State Bar of Arizona bar examination in 1986 and was admitted to the State Bar of Arizona on October 25, 1986.

Rotellini began her career working as an attorney in private practice from 1986 until 1992.  She then served as an assistant attorney general for the State of Arizona from 1992 until 2005, then was the Assistant Superintendent of Arizona Department Finance Institutions from 2005 until 2006, and was appointed in 2006 as the superintendent by Governor Janet Napolitano and served until 2009.

In August 2009, Rotellini resigned from her appointed position as superintendent to join the Phoenix law firm of Zwillinger & Greek PC.

In 2010 and 2014, Rotellini ran unsuccessfully for Arizona Attorney General.

In 2018, Rotellini was elected state party chair over LD-16 Chair Scott Prior.

Election results

References

External links 
 
 

20th-century American lawyers
20th-century American women lawyers
21st-century American lawyers
21st-century American women lawyers
2020 United States presidential electors
Arizona Democratic Party chairs
Arizona Democrats
Arizona lawyers
Candidates in the 2010 United States elections
Candidates in the 2014 United States elections
Living people
Notre Dame Law School alumni
People from Sheridan, Wyoming
Rocky Mountain College alumni
Women in Arizona politics
Year of birth missing (living people)